The 2022–23 Arkansas–Pine Bluff Golden Lions men's basketball team represented the University of Arkansas at Pine Bluff in the 2022–23 NCAA Division I men's basketball season. The Golden Lions, led by second-year head coach Solomon Bozeman, played their home games at the H.O. Clemmons Arena in Pine Bluff, Arkansas as members of the Southwestern Athletic Conference.

Previous season
The Golden Lions finished the 2021–22 season 7–24, 5–13 in SWAC play to finish in second-to-last place. In turn, they failed to qualify for the SWAC tournament.

Roster

Schedule and results

|-
!colspan=12 style=""| Non-conference regular season

|-
!colspan=12 style=""| SWAC regular season

Sources

References

Arkansas–Pine Bluff Golden Lions men's basketball seasons
Arkansas–Pine Bluff Golden Lions
Arkansas–Pine Bluff Golden Lions men's basketball
Arkansas–Pine Bluff Golden Lions men's basketball